The 2019 NCAA Division III women's basketball tournament was the 38th annual tournament hosted by the NCAA to determine the national champion of Division III women's collegiate basketball in the United States.

Thomas More defeated Bowdoin in the championship game, 81–67, to claim the Saints' second Division III national title (Thomas More's 2015 title was vacated and does not count toward official NCAA records).

The championship rounds were hosted by Roanoke College at the Cregger Center in Salem, Virginia.

Bracket

Final Four

All-tournament team
 Abby Kelly, Bowdoin
 Makenzie Mason, Scranton
 Hannah Spaulding, St. Thomas (MN)
 Shelby Rupp, Thomas More
 Madison Temple, Thomas More

See also
 2019 NCAA Division I women's basketball tournament
 2019 NCAA Division II women's basketball tournament
 2019 NAIA Division I women's basketball tournament
 2019 NAIA Division II women's basketball tournament
 2019 NCAA Division III men's basketball tournament

References

 
NCAA Division III women's basketball tournament
2019 in sports in Virginia